Tyrosine-protein phosphatase non-receptor type 12 is an enzyme that in humans is encoded by the PTPN12 gene.

The protein encoded by this gene is a member of the protein tyrosine phosphatase (PTP) family. PTPs are known to be signaling molecules that regulate a variety of cellular processes including cell growth, differentiation, mitotic cycle, and oncogenic transformation. This PTP contains a C-terminal PEST motif, which serves as a protein–protein interaction domain, and may be related to protein intracellular half-life. This PTP was found to bind and dephosphorylate the product of oncogene c-ABL, thus may play a role in oncogenesis. This PTP was shown to interact with, and dephosphorylate, various of cytoskeleton and cell adhesion molecules, such as p130 (Cas), CAKbeta/PTK2B, PSTPIP1, and paxillin, which suggested its regulatory roles in controlling cell shape and mobility.

Interactions
PTPN12 has been shown to interact with BCAR1, Grb2, PSTPIP1, TGFB1I1, Paxillin and SHC1.

References

Further reading